Tim McAuliffe (born September 18) is a Canadian comedy writer, television producer and occasional actor from Montreal, Quebec, Canada, known for his work on The Last Man On Earth, The Office, Late Night with Jimmy Fallon, Up All Night, Corner Gas, This Hour Has 22 Minutes, and creating the TV series Son Of A Critch and Happy Together (CBS).

Career
Tim is a writer/producer who is currently the Co-Creator/Executive Producer of CBC's Son Of a Critch. He has also serves as showrunner on the upcoming Paramount Plus show, Players. He is also a writer/producer on Peacock's MacGruber (starring Will Forte, Kriten Wiig, and Ryan Phillippe). His past credits include, writer/producer for NBC's The Office, writer/executive producer for FOX's Last Man On Earth, writer for Late Night with Jimmy Fallon, writer/producer of NBC's Up All Night, and executive producer/creator of CBS's Happy Together.

In Canada, he was showrunner/executive producer/writer on CBC TV's long-running (24 years) This Hour Has 22 Minutes, a writer for English Canada's most successful sitcom of all time, CTV's Corner Gas, and the creator/executive producer/showrunner of CTV's Satisfaction.  He has also written a series of live gala performances at the Just for Laughs Comedy Festival.  He has won two Writers Guild of Canada Awards.

Filmography
As writer
 '88 Dodge Aries (2002) (also as producer, director)
 Mistress Shopping (2004)
 Branding Mupatu (2004) as Steve Sandusky
 2005 MuchMusic Video Awards (2005) (TV)
 Brain Fart (2005)
 Stars on Trial (2005)
 Battle of the Exes (2006)
 2006 MuchMusic Video Awards (2006)
 Much Music Hot/Not 2006 (2006)
 100 Best Videos Ever (2007)
 Video on Trial (52 episodes, 2005–2007) 
 The Hour (5 episodes, 2006–2007)
 The Ha!ifax Comedy Fest (6 episodes, 2010)
 Late Night with Jimmy Fallon (134 episodes, 2009–2010) 
 Moderation Town (2010)
 Dan for Mayor (1 episode, 2011) 
 Decline of the American Empire (2012)
 This Hour Has 22 Minutes (81 episodes, 2006–2012) 
 Just for Laughs (1 episode, 2012) 
 Dr. Bob's House (2012)
 Up All Night (5 episodes, 2011–2012) 
 The Muppets All-Star Comedy Gala (2012)
 The Office (1 episode, 2013) 
 Satisfaction (5 episodes, 2013)
 The Last Man on Earth (9 episodes, 2015-2017)
 Happy Together (2018-2019)
 Bless the Harts (2021)
 Episode #21: "Big Pimpin"
 As actor
 Mistress Shopping (2004) as Steve Sandusky
 Branding Mupatu (2004) as Steve Sandusky
 Stars on Trial (2005) as Rusty Waters
 Famous Fallouts (2005) as Dan Snyder
 2006 MuchMusic Video Awards (2006) as Mark 'The PA'
 Overrated in '06 (2006) as Lord Balthazar Sandusky

Awards and nominations
McAuliffe has received peer and industry recognition for his work on This Hour Has 22 Minutes.
 2008, won Writers Guild of Canada WGC Award Variety award for This Hour Has 22 Minutes
 2008, nominated for Writers Guild of Canada WGC Award Variety award for This Hour Has 22 Minutes
 2008, nominated for Gemini Award "Best Writing in a Comedy or Variety Program or Series" for This Hour Has 22 Minutes 
 2011, nominated for Gemini Award for "Best Comedy Program or Series" for This Hour Has 22 Minutes

References

External links

1974 births
21st-century Canadian male writers
Anglophone Quebec people
Canadian Comedy Award winners
Canadian comedy writers
Canadian television producers
Canadian television writers
Living people
Writers from Montreal